Martyr Lt. Anwar Hossain (May 5, 1948 - March 29, 1971) was a Bangladesh Army officer who fought in the Bangladesh Liberation war. He was killed in the war and posthumously awarded Bir Uttom, the second highest gallantry award in Bangladesh.

Early life
Anwar Hossain was born in Sonapur, Shahrasti, Chandpur, East Bengal, British India, on 5 May 1948. His father's name was MD Abdul hoque and mother was NurJahan begum. In 1965 he finished his SSC and in 1967 HSC from Faujdarhat Cadet College. He joined the Pakistan Army after studying for one year in East Pakistan University of Engineering and Technology.

Career
Hossain joined the Pakistan Military Academy and was commission as a second lieutenant on 29 March 1970. He was posted to the 1st East Bengal Regiment under the 107 infantry brigade in Jessore Cantonment.

Death and legacy
On 25 March 1971, Pakistan Army launched Operation Searchlight and Bangladesh Liberation war started. On 29 March 1971, 107 infantry brigade commander, Brigadier General Abdur Rahim Durrani, ordered the 1st East Bengal Regiment to be disarmed. The regiment was surrounded by 25 Baloch Regiment and 3 Frontier Force. The Bengal regiment led by Lieutenant Hafizuddin Ahmed and Hossain resisted. They fought against the West Pakistani troops and escaped Jessore Cantonment. Hossain was killed in the fighting. He was posthumously awarded Bir Uttom. The Shaheed Bir Uttam Lt. Anwar Girls School & College in Dhaka Cantonment was named after him.

References

1948 births
1971 deaths
People killed in the Bangladesh Liberation War
Bangladesh University of Engineering and Technology alumni
People from Chandpur District
Bangladesh Army officers
Recipients of the Bir Uttom
Mukti Bahini personnel